Rape in Saudi Arabia is regulated by Islamic law, which is the basis for the legal system of Saudi Arabia. Under Islamic law, the punishment which a court can impose on the rapist may range from Life sentence to execution. In addition, there is no prohibition of marital rape.

If the rape victim first entered the rapist's company in violation of purdah, she also stands to be punished by the law's current holdings. In 2002, there were 0.3 reported rapes per 100,000 population.

Reports
Human Rights Watch has investigated the situation, and their report concludes that a rape victim may be punished when they speak out against the crime. In one case, the victim's sentence was doubled for speaking out, and the court also harassed the victim's lawyer, going so far as to confiscate his professional licence.

However, it has also been acknowledged that Shariah law, which punishes rapists, serves as the basis of the country's legal system. However, the shariah does not include that women nor men be punished when they are a victim of rape.

In 2009, the Saudi Gazette reported that a 23-year-old, unmarried woman was sentenced to one year in prison and 100 lashes for adultery after the judge refused to believe that she was raped. This woman had been gang-raped, became pregnant, and had tried (unsuccessfully) to abort the fetus. The flogging was postponed until after the delivery.

The sentences for rape cases are also extremely unbalanced in Saudi Arabia. For example, in February 2013, a Saudi preacher raped, tortured, and murdered his 5-year-old daughter. He was sentenced to eight years in prison, 800 lashes, and a fine of one million riyals (US$270,000) to be paid to the girl's mother, his ex-wife. Contrasted with this is the case of two Pakistani citizens who were beheaded by the state after being convicted of a rape.

The Qatif rape case is a much-publicized gang rape case. The victims were a Shia teenage girl from Qatif (Eastern Province, Saudi Arabia) and her male companion, who were kidnapped and gang-raped by seven Saudi men in mid-2006. A Saudi Sharia court sentenced the perpetrators to varying sentences involving 80 to 1,000 lashes and imprisonment up to ten years for four of them. The court also sentenced the two victims to six months in prison and 90 lashes each for "being alone with a man who is not a relative" in a parked car. The appeals court doubled the victims' sentences in late 2007 as punishment for the heavy media coverage of the event in the international press regarding the treatment of women in the Kingdom of Saudi Arabia and Saudi judicial practices.

In December 2007, the Saudi King Abdullah issued an official pardon for the two victims, citing his ultimate authority to revise "discretionary" punishments in accordance with the public good, although the pardon did not reflect any lack of confidence in the Saudi justice system or in the fairness of the verdicts.

See also
 Qatif rape case - Gang rape case, around 2006
 Women's rights in Saudi Arabia

References

Further reading

 
Crimes against women
Saudi Arabia
Violence in Saudi Arabia